Animal rights is the philosophy according to which many or all sentient animals have moral worth independent of their utility to humans, and that their most basic interests—such as avoiding suffering—should be afforded the same consideration as similar interests of human beings. Broadly speaking, and particularly in popular discourse, the term "animal rights" is often used synonymously with "animal protection" or "animal liberation". More narrowly, "animal rights" refers to the idea that many animals have fundamental rights to be treated with respect as individuals—rights to life, liberty, and freedom from torture that may not be overridden by considerations of aggregate welfare.

Many advocates of animal rights oppose the assignment of moral value and fundamental protections on the basis of species membership alone. They consider this idea, known as speciesism, a prejudice as irrational as any other. They maintain that animals should not be viewed as property or used as food, clothing, entertainment, or beasts of burden merely because they are not human. Multiple cultural traditions around the world such as Jainism, Taoism, Hinduism, Buddhism, Shinto and Animism also espouse forms of animal rights.

In parallel to the debate about moral rights, law schools in North America now often teach animal law, and several legal scholars, such as Steven M. Wise and Gary L. Francione, support the extension of basic legal rights and personhood to non-human animals. The animals most often considered in arguments for personhood are hominids. Some animal-rights academics support this because it would break the species barrier, but others oppose it because it predicates moral value on mental complexity rather than on sentience alone. , 29 countries had enacted bans on hominoid experimentation; Argentina has granted a captive orangutan basic human rights since 2014.

Outside of primates, animal-rights discussions most often address the status of mammals (compare charismatic megafauna). Other animals (considered less sentient) have gained less attention—insects relatively little (outside Jainism) and animal-like bacteria hardly any. The vast majority of animals have no legally recognised rights.

Critics of animal rights argue that nonhuman animals are unable to enter into a social contract, and thus cannot be possessors of rights, a view summarised by the philosopher Roger Scruton, who writes that only humans have duties, and therefore only humans have rights. Another argument, associated with the utilitarian tradition, maintains that animals may be used as resources so long as there is no unnecessary suffering; animals may have some moral standing, but are inferior in status to human beings, and any interests they have may be overridden, though what counts as "necessary" suffering or a legitimate sacrifice of interests can vary considerably. Certain forms of animal-rights activism, such as the destruction of fur farms and of animal laboratories by the Animal Liberation Front, have attracted criticism, including from within the animal-rights movement itself, and prompted the U.S. Congress to enact laws, including the Animal Enterprise Terrorism Act, allowing the prosecution of this sort of activity as terrorism.

History

In religion

For some the basis of animal rights is in religion or animal worship (or in general nature worship), with some religions banning killing of any animal, and in other religions animals can be considered unclean.

Hindu and Buddhist societies abandoned animal sacrifice and embraced vegetarianism from the 3rd century BCE. One of the most important sanctions of the Jain, Hindu and Buddhist faiths is the concept of ahimsa, or refraining from the destruction of life. According to Buddhist belief, humans do not deserve preferential treatment over other living beings. The Dharmic interpretation of this doctrine prohibits the killing of any living being. Ancient Tamil works such as the Tolkāppiyam and Tirukkural contain passages that extend the idea of non-violence to all living beings.

In Islam, animal rights were recognized early by the Sharia. This recognition is based on both the Qur'an and the Hadith. In the Qur'an, there are many references to animals, detailing that they have souls, form communities, communicate with God and worship Him in their own way. Muhammad forbade his followers to harm any animal and asked them to respect the rights of animals.

According to Christianity, all animals, from the smallest to the largest, are cared for and loved. According to the Bible, "All these animals waited for the Lord, that the Lord might give them food at the hour. The Lord gives them, they receive; The Lord opens his hand, and they are filled with good things". It further says God "gave food to the animals, and made the crows cry."

Philosophical and legal approaches

Overview

The two main philosophical approaches to animal ethics are utilitarian and rights-based. The former is exemplified by Peter Singer, and the latter by Tom Regan and Gary Francione. Their differences reflect a distinction philosophers draw between ethical theories that judge the rightness of an act by its consequences (consequentialism/teleological ethics, or utilitarianism), and those that focus on the principle behind the act, almost regardless of consequences (deontological ethics). Deontologists argue that there are acts we should never perform, even if failing to do so entails a worse outcome.

There are a number of positions that can be defended from a consequentalist or deontologist perspective, including the capabilities approach, represented by Martha Nussbaum, and the egalitarian approach, which has been examined by Ingmar Persson and Peter Vallentyne. The capabilities approach focuses on what individuals require to fulfill their capabilities: Nussbaum (2006) argues that animals need a right to life, some control over their environment, company, play, and physical health.

Stephen R. L. Clark, Mary Midgley, and Bernard Rollin also discuss animal rights in terms of animals being permitted to lead a life appropriate for their kind. Egalitarianism favors an equal distribution of happiness among all individuals, which makes the interests of the worse off more important than those of the better off. Another approach, virtue ethics, holds that in considering how to act we should consider the character of the actor, and what kind of moral agents we should be. Rosalind Hursthouse has suggested an approach to animal rights based on virtue ethics. Mark Rowlands has proposed a contractarian approach.

Utilitarianism

Nussbaum (2004) writes that utilitarianism, starting with Jeremy Bentham and John Stuart Mill, has contributed more to the recognition of the moral status of animals than any other ethical theory. The utilitarian philosopher most associated with animal rights is Peter Singer, professor of bioethics at Princeton University. Singer is not a rights theorist, but uses the language of rights to discuss how we ought to treat individuals. He is a preference utilitarian, meaning that he judges the rightness of an act by the extent to which it satisfies the preferences (interests) of those affected.

His position is that there is no reason not to give equal consideration to the interests of human and nonhumans, though his principle of equality does not require identical treatment. A mouse and a man both have an interest in not being kicked, and there are no moral or logical grounds for failing to accord those interests equal weight. Interests are predicated on the ability to suffer, nothing more, and once it is established that a being has interests, those interests must be given equal consideration. Singer quotes the English philosopher Henry Sidgwick (1838–1900): "The good of any one individual is of no more importance, from the point of view ... of the Universe, than the good of any other."

Singer argues that equality of consideration is a prescription, not an assertion of fact: if the equality of the sexes were based only on the idea that men and women were equally intelligent, we would have to abandon the practice of equal consideration if this were later found to be false. But the moral idea of equality does not depend on matters of fact such as intelligence, physical strength, or moral capacity. Equality therefore cannot be grounded on the outcome of scientific investigations into the intelligence of nonhumans. All that matters is whether they can suffer.

Commentators on all sides of the debate now accept that animals suffer and feel pain, although it was not always so. Bernard Rollin, professor of philosophy, animal sciences, and biomedical sciences at Colorado State University, writes that Descartes's influence continued to be felt until the 1980s. Veterinarians trained in the US before 1989 were taught to ignore pain, he writes, and at least one major veterinary hospital in the 1960s did not stock narcotic analgesics for animal pain control. In his interactions with scientists, he was often asked to "prove" that animals are conscious, and to provide "scientifically acceptable" evidence that they could feel pain.

Scientific publications have made it clear since the 1980s that the majority of researchers do believe animals suffer and feel pain, though it continues to be argued that their suffering may be reduced by an inability to experience the same dread of anticipation as humans or to remember the suffering as vividly. The ability of animals to suffer, even it may vary in severity, is the basis for Singer's application of equal consideration. The problem of animal suffering, and animal consciousness in general, arose primarily because it was argued that animals have no language. Singer writes that, if language were needed to communicate pain, it would often be impossible to know when humans are in pain, though we can observe pain behavior and make a calculated guess based on it. He argues that there is no reason to suppose that the pain behavior of nonhumans would have a different meaning from the pain behavior of humans.

Subjects-of-a-life

Tom Regan, professor emeritus of philosophy at North Carolina State University, argues in The Case for Animal Rights (1983) that nonhuman animals are what he calls "subjects-of-a-life", and as such are bearers of rights. He writes that, because the moral rights of humans are based on their possession of certain cognitive abilities, and because these abilities are also possessed by at least some nonhuman animals, such animals must have the same moral rights as humans. Although only humans act as moral agents, both marginal-case humans, such as infants, and at least some nonhumans must have the status of "moral patients".

Moral patients are unable to formulate moral principles, and as such are unable to do right or wrong, even though what they do may be beneficial or harmful. Only moral agents are able to engage in moral action. Animals for Regan have "intrinsic value" as subjects-of-a-life, and cannot be regarded as a means to an end, a view that places him firmly in the abolitionist camp. His theory does not extend to all animals, but only to those that can be regarded as subjects-of-a-life. He argues that all normal mammals of at least one year of age would qualify:

Whereas Singer is primarily concerned with improving the treatment of animals and accepts that, in some hypothetical scenarios, individual animals might be used legitimately to further human or nonhuman ends, Regan believes we ought to treat nonhuman animals as we would humans. He applies the strict Kantian ideal (which Kant himself applied only to humans) that they ought never to be sacrificed as a means to an end, and must be treated as ends in themselves.

Abolitionism

Gary Francione, professor of law and philosophy at Rutgers Law School in Newark, is a leading abolitionist writer, arguing that animals need only one right, the right not to be owned. Everything else would follow from that paradigm shift. He writes that, although most people would condemn the mistreatment of animals, and in many countries there are laws that seem to reflect those concerns, "in practice the legal system allows any use of animals, however abhorrent." The law only requires that any suffering not be "unnecessary". In deciding what counts as "unnecessary", an animal's interests are weighed against the interests of human beings, and the latter almost always prevail.

Francione's Animals, Property, and the Law (1995) was the first extensive jurisprudential treatment of animal rights. In it, Francione compares the situation of animals to the treatment of slaves in the United States, where legislation existed that appeared to protect them while the courts ignored that the institution of slavery itself rendered the protection unenforceable. He offers as an example the United States Animal Welfare Act, which he describes as an example of symbolic legislation, intended to assuage public concern about the treatment of animals, but difficult to implement.

He argues that a focus on animal welfare, rather than animal rights, may worsen the position of animals by making the public feel comfortable about using them and entrenching the view of them as property. He calls animal rights groups who pursue animal welfare issues, such as People for the Ethical Treatment of Animals, the "new welfarists", arguing that they have more in common with 19th-century animal protectionists than with the animal rights movement; indeed, the terms "animal protection" and "protectionism" are increasingly favored. His position in 1996 was that there is no animal rights movement in the United States.

Contractarianism

Mark Rowlands, professor of philosophy at the University of Florida, has proposed a contractarian approach, based on the original position and the veil of ignorance—a "state of nature" thought experiment that tests intuitions about justice and fairness—in John Rawls's A Theory of Justice (1971). In the original position, individuals choose principles of justice (what kind of society to form, and how primary social goods will be distributed), unaware of their individual characteristics—their race, sex, class, or intelligence, whether they are able-bodied or disabled, rich or poor—and therefore unaware of which role they will assume in the society they are about to form.

The idea is that, operating behind the veil of ignorance, they will choose a social contract in which there is basic fairness and justice for them no matter the position they occupy. Rawls did not include species membership as one of the attributes hidden from the decision-makers in the original position. Rowlands proposes extending the veil of ignorance to include rationality, which he argues is an undeserved property similar to characteristics including race, sex and intelligence.

Prima facie rights theory

American philosopher Timothy Garry has proposed an approach that deems nonhuman animals worthy of prima facie rights. In a philosophical context, a prima facie (Latin for "on the face of it" or "at first glance") right is one that appears to be applicable at first glance, but upon closer examination may be outweighed by other considerations. In his book Ethics: A Pluralistic Approach to Moral Theory, Lawrence Hinman characterizes such rights as "the right is real but leaves open the question of whether it is applicable and overriding in a particular situation". The idea that nonhuman animals are worthy of prima facie rights is to say that, in a sense, animals have rights that can be overridden by many other considerations, especially those conflicting a human's right to life, liberty, property, and the pursuit of happiness. Garry supports his view arguing:

In sum, Garry suggests that humans have obligations to nonhuman animals; animals do not, and ought not to, have uninfringible rights against humans.

Feminism and animal rights

Women have played a central role in animal advocacy since the 19th century. The anti-vivisection movement in the 19th and early 20th century in England and the United States was largely run by women, including Frances Power Cobbe, Anna Kingsford, Lizzy Lind af Hageby and Caroline Earle White (1833–1916). Garner writes that 70 per cent of the membership of the Victoria Street Society (one of the anti-vivisection groups founded by Cobbe) were women, as were 70 per cent of the membership of the British RSPCA in 1900.

The modern animal advocacy movement has a similar representation of women. They are not invariably in leadership positions: during the March for Animals in Washington, D.C., in 1990—the largest animal rights demonstration held until then in the United States—most of the participants were women, but most of the platform speakers were men. Nevertheless, several influential animal advocacy groups have been founded by women, including the British Union for the Abolition of Vivisection by Cobbe in London in 1898; the Animal Welfare Board of India by Rukmini Devi Arundale in 1962; and People for the Ethical Treatment of Animals, co-founded by Ingrid Newkirk in 1980. In the Netherlands, Marianne Thieme and Esther Ouwehand were elected to parliament in 2006 representing the Parliamentary group for Animals.

The preponderance of women in the movement has led to a body of academic literature exploring feminism and animal rights, such as feminism and vegetarianism or veganism, the oppression of women and animals, and the male association of women and animals with nature and emotion, rather than reason—an association that several feminist writers have embraced. Lori Gruen writes that women and animals serve the same symbolic function in a patriarchal society: both are "the used"; the dominated, submissive "Other". When the British feminist Mary Wollstonecraft (1759–1797) published A Vindication of the Rights of Woman (1792), Thomas Taylor (1758–1835), a Cambridge philosopher, responded with an anonymous parody, A Vindication of the Rights of Brutes (1792), saying that Wollstonecraft's arguments for women's rights could be applied equally to animals, a position he intended as reductio ad absurdum. In her works The Sexual Politics of Meat: A Feminist-Vegetarian Critical Theory (1990) and The Pornography of Meat (2004), Carol J. Adams focuses in particular on what she argues are the links between the oppression of women and that of non-human animals.

Transhumanism
Some transhumanists argue for animal rights, liberation, and "uplift" of animal consciousness into machines. Transhumanism also understands animal rights on a gradation or spectrum with other types of sentient rights, including human rights and the rights of conscious artificial intelligences (posthuman rights).

Socialism and anti-capitalism

According to sociologist David Nibert of Wittenberg University, the struggle for animal liberation must happen in tandem with a more generalized struggle against human oppression and exploitation under global capitalism. He says that under a more egalitarian democratic socialist system, one that would "allow a more just and peaceful order to emerge" and be "characterized by economic democracy and a democratically controlled state and mass media", there would be "much greater potential to inform the public about vital global issues—and the potential for  "campaigns to improve the lives of other animals" to be "more abolitionist in nature." Philosopher Steven Best of the University of Texas at El Paso states that the animal liberation movement, as characterized by the Animal Liberation Front and its various offshoots, "is a significant threat to global capital."

Critics

R. G. Frey
R. G. Frey, professor of philosophy at Bowling Green State University, is a preference utilitarian, as is Singer. But, in his early work, Interests and Rights (1980), Frey disagreed with Singer—who in his Animal Liberation (1975) wrote that the interests of nonhuman animals must be included when judging the consequences of an act—on the grounds that animals have no interests. Frey argues that interests are dependent on desire, and that no desire can exist without a corresponding belief. Animals have no beliefs, because a belief state requires the ability to hold a second-order belief—a belief about the belief—which he argues requires language: "If someone were to say, e.g. 'The cat believes that the door is locked,' then that person is holding, as I see it, that the cat holds the declarative sentence 'The door is locked' to be true; and I can see no reason whatever for crediting the cat or any other creature which lacks language, including human infants, with entertaining declarative sentences."

Carl Cohen
Carl Cohen, professor of philosophy at the University of Michigan, argues that rights holders must be able to distinguish between their own interests and what is right. "The holders of rights must have the capacity to comprehend rules of duty governing all, including themselves. In applying such rules, [they] ... must recognize possible conflicts between what is in their own interest and what is just. Only in a community of beings capable of self-restricting moral judgments can the concept of a right be correctly invoked." Cohen rejects Singer's argument that, since a brain-damaged human could not make moral judgments, moral judgments cannot be used as the distinguishing characteristic for determining who is awarded rights. Cohen writes that the test for moral judgment "is not a test to be administered to humans one by one", but should be applied to the capacity of members of the species in general.

Richard Posner

Judge Richard Posner of the United States Court of Appeals for the Seventh Circuit debated the issue of animal rights in 2001 with Peter Singer. Posner posits that his moral intuition tells him "that human beings prefer their own. If a dog threatens a human infant, even if it requires causing more pain to the dog to stop it, than the dog would have caused to the infant, then we favour the child. It would be monstrous to spare the dog."

Singer challenges this by arguing that formerly unequal rights for gays, women, and certain races were justified using the same set of intuitions. Posner replies that equality in civil rights did not occur because of ethical arguments, but because facts mounted that there were no morally significant differences between humans based on race, sex, or sexual orientation that would support inequality. If and when similar facts emerge about humans and animals, the differences in rights will erode too. But facts will drive equality, not ethical arguments that run contrary to instinct, he argues. Posner calls his approach "soft utilitarianism", in contrast to Singer's "hard utilitarianism". He argues:

Roger Scruton
Roger Scruton, the British philosopher, argued that rights imply obligations. Every legal privilege, he wrote, imposes a burden on the one who does not possess that privilege: that is, "your right may be my duty." Scruton therefore regarded the emergence of the animal rights movement as "the strangest cultural shift within the liberal worldview", because the idea of rights and responsibilities is, he argued, distinctive to the human condition, and it makes no sense to spread them beyond our own species.

He accused animal rights advocates of "pre-scientific" anthropomorphism, attributing traits to animals that are, he says, Beatrix Potter-like, where "only man is vile." It is within this fiction that the appeal of animal rights lies, he argued. The world of animals is non-judgmental, filled with dogs who return our affection almost no matter what we do to them, and cats who pretend to be affectionate when, in fact, they care only about themselves. It is, he argued, a fantasy, a world of escape.

Scruton singled out Peter Singer, a prominent Australian philosopher and animal-rights activist, for criticism. He wrote that Singer's works, including Animal Liberation, "contain little or no philosophical argument. They derive their radical moral conclusions from a vacuous utilitarianism that counts the pain and pleasure of all living things as equally significant and that ignores just about everything that has been said in our philosophical tradition about the real distinction between persons and animals."

Tom Regan countered this view of rights by distinguishing moral agents and moral patients.

Public attitudes
According to a paper published in 2000 by Harold Herzog and Lorna Dorr, previous academic surveys of attitudes towards animal rights have tended to suffer from small sample sizes and non-representative groups. However, a number of factors appear to correlate with the attitude of individuals regarding the treatment of animals and animal rights. These include gender, age, occupation, religion, and level of education. There has also been evidence to suggest that prior experience with pets may be a factor in people's attitudes.

According to some studies, women are more likely to empathize with the cause of animal rights than men. A 1996 study suggested that factors that may partially explain this discrepancy include attitudes towards feminism and science, scientific literacy, and the presence of a greater emphasis on "nurturance or compassion" among women.

A common misconception on the concept of animal rights is that its proponents want to grant non-human animals the exact same legal rights as humans, such as the right to vote. This is not the case, as the concept is that animals should have rights with equal consideration to their interests (for example, cats do not have any interest in voting, so they should not have the right to vote). A 2016 study found that support for animal testing may not be based on cogent philosophical rationales, and more open debate is warranted.

A 2007 survey to examine whether or not people who believed in evolution were more likely to support animal rights than creationists and believers in intelligent design found that this was largely the case—according to the researchers, the respondents who were strong Christian fundamentalists and believers in creationism were less likely to advocate for animal rights than those who were less fundamentalist in their beliefs. The findings extended previous research, such as a 1992 study which found that 48% of animal rights activists were atheists or agnostic. A 2019 study in The Washington Post found that those who have positive attitudes toward animal rights also tend to have a positive view of universal healthcare, favor reducing discrimination against African Americans, the LGBT community and undocumented immigrants, and expanding welfare to aid the poor.

Two surveys found that attitudes towards animal rights tactics, such as direct action, are very diverse within the animal rights communities. Near half (50% and 39% in two surveys) of activists do not support direct action. One survey concluded "it would be a mistake to portray animal rights activists as homogeneous."

See also

Animal cognition
Animal consciousness
Animal–industrial complex
Animal liberation
Animal liberation movement
Animal liberationist
Animal rights by country or territory
Animal studies
Animal trial
Animal Welfare Institute
Antinaturalism (politics)
Cambridge Declaration on Consciousness
Chick culling
Critical animal studies
Deep ecology
Do Animals Have Rights? (book)
List of animal rights advocates
List of songs about animal rights
Moral circle expansion
Open rescue
Plant rights
Sentientism
Timeline of animal welfare and rights
Wild animal suffering
World Animal Day

References

Bibliography
Books and papers are cited in short form in the footnotes, with full citations here. News and other sources are cited in full in the footnotes.

 
 
 
Benthall, Jonathan (2007). "Animal liberation and rights", Anthropology Today, volume 23, issue 2, April.
Bentham, Jeremy (1781). Principles of Penal Law. 
Beauchamp, Tom (2009). "The Moral Standing of Animals", in Marc Bekoff. Encyclopedia of Animal Rights and Animal Welfare. Greenwood. 
Beauchamp, Tom (2011a). "Introduction," in Tom Beauchamp and R.G. Frey (eds.). The Oxford Handbook of Animal Ethics. Oxford University Press. 
Beauchamp, Tom (2011b). "Rights Theory and Animal Rights," in Beauchamp and Frey, op cit. 

Clark, Stephen R. L. (1977). The Moral Status of Animals. Oxford University Press. 
Cohen, Carl (1986). "The Case for the Use of Animals in Biomedical Research", New England Journal of Medicine, vol. 315, issue 14, October, pp. 865–870.
Cohen, Carl and Regan, Tom (2001). The Animal Rights Debate. Rowman & Littlefield. 
Craig, Edward (ed.) (1988). "Deontological Ethics" and "Consequentalism." Routledge Encyclopedia of Philosophy.
DeGrazia, David (2002). Animal Rights: A Very Short Introduction. Oxford University Press.
Donovan, Josephine (1993). "Animal Rights and Feminist Theory," in Greta Gaard. Ecofeminism: Women, Animals, Nature. Temple University Press.
Francione, Gary (1996). Rain Without Thunder: The Ideology of the Animal Rights Movement. Temple University Press.
Francione, Gary (1995). Animals, Property, and the Law. Temple University Press.
Francione, Gary (2008). Animals as Persons. Columbia University Press.
Francione, Gary and Garner, Robert (2010). The Animal Rights Debate: Abolition Or Regulation? Columbia University Press.
Fellenz, Mark R. (2007). The Moral Menagerie: Philosophy and Animal Rights. University of Illinois Press.
Frey, R.G. (1980). Interests and Rights: The Case against Animals. Clarendon Press.
Frey, R.G. (1989). "Why Animals Lack Beliefs and Desires," in Peter Singer and Tom Regan (eds.). Animal Rights and Human Obligations. Prentice Hall.
Garner, Robert (2004). Animals, Politics and Morality. Manchester University Press.
Garner, Robert (2005). The Political Theory of Animals Rights. Manchester University Press.
Giannelli, Michael A. (1985). "Three Blind Mice, See How They Run: A Critique of Behavioral Research With Animals". In M.W. Fox & L.D. Mickley (eds.), Advances in Animal Welfare Science 1985/1986 (pp. 109–164). Washington, DC: The Humane Society of the United States
Gruen, Lori (1993). "Dismantling Oppression: An Analysis of the Connection Between Women and Animals", in Greta Gaard. Ecofeminism: Women, Animals, Nature. Temple University Press.
Griffin, Donald (1984). Animal Thinking. Harvard University Press.
 Horta, Oscar (2010). "What Is Speciesism?", The Journal of Environmental and Agricultural Ethics, Vol. 23, No. 3, June, pp. 243–266.
Hursthouse, Rosalind (2000a). On Virtue Ethics. Oxford University Press.
Hursthouse, Rosalind (2000b). Ethics, Humans and Other Animals. Routledge.
Jakopovich, Daniel (2021). "The UK's Animal Welfare (Sentience) Bill Excludes the Vast Majority of Animals: Why We Must Expand Our Moral Circle to Include Invertebrates", Animals & Society Research Initiative, University of Victoria, Canada.
Kant, Immanuel (1785). Groundwork of the Metaphysic of Morals.
Kean, Hilda (1995). "The 'Smooth Cool Men of Science': The Feminist and Socialist Response to Vivisection", History Workshop Journal, No. 40 (Autumn), pp. 16–38.

Lansbury, Coral (1985). The Old Brown Dog: Women, Workers, and Vivisection in Edwardian England. University of Wisconsin Press.
Legge, Debbi and Brooman, Simon (1997). Law Relating to Animals. Cavendish Publishing. 
Leneman, Leah (1999). "No Animal Food: The Road to Veganism in Britain, 1909–1944," Society and Animals, 7, 1–5.
Locke, John (1693). Some Thoughts Concerning Education.
MacKinnon, Catharine A. (2004). "Of Mice and Men," in Nussbaum and Sunstein, op cit.
Mason, Peter (1997). The Brown Dog Affair. Two Sevens Publishing.
Midgley, Mary (1984). Animals and Why They Matter. University of Georgia Press. 
Molland, Neil (2004). "Thirty Years of Direct Action" in Best and Nocella, op cit.
Monaghan, Rachael (2000). "Terrorism in the Name of Animal Rights," in Taylor, Maxwell and Horgan, John. The Future of Terrorism. Routledge.
Murray, L. (2006). "The ASPCA–Pioneers in Animal Welfare", Encyclopædia Britannica's Advocacy for Animals.
Nash, Roderick (1989). The Rights of Nature: A History of Environmental Ethics. University of Wisconsin Press.
Newkirk, Ingrid (2004). "The ALF: Who, Why, and What?", in Steven Best and Anthony Nocella. (eds).Terrorists or Freedom Fighters? Reflections on the Liberation of Animals. Lantern 2004.

Nussbaum, Martha (2004). "Beyond Compassion and Humanity: Justice for Nonhuman Animals", in Cass Sunstein and Martha Nussbaum (eds.). Animal Rights: Current Debates and New Directions. Oxford University Press.
Nussbaum, Martha (2006). Frontiers of Justice: Disability, Nationality, Species Membership. Belknap Press.
Posner, Richard and Singer, Peter (June 15, 2001). Posner-Singer debate, Slate.
Posner, Richard and Singer, Peter (2004). "Animal rights" in Sunstein and Nussbaum, op cit.
Rachels, James (2009). "Darwin, Charles," in Bekoff, op cit.
Redclift, Michael R. (2010). The International Handbook of Environmental Sociology. Edward Elgar Publishing.
Regan, Tom (1983). The Case for Animal Rights. University of California Press.
Regan, Tom (2001). Defending Animal Rights. University of Illinois Press.
Rollin, Bernard (1981). Animal Rights and Human Morality. Prometheus Books.
Rollin, Bernard (1989). The Unheeded Cry: Animal Consciousness, Animal Pain, and Science. New York: Oxford University Press.
Rollin, Bernard (2007). "Animal research: a moral science", Nature, EMBO Reports 8, 6, pp. 521–525.
Rowlands, Mark (2009) [1998]. Animal Rights. A Defense. Palgrave Macmillan.
Ryder, Richard (2000) [1989]. Animal Revolution: Changing Attitudes Towards Speciesism. Berg.
Sapontzis, Steve (1985). "Moral Community and Animal Rights", American Philosophical Quarterly, Vol. 22, No. 3 (July), pp. 251–257.
Scruton, Roger (1998). Animal Rights and Wrongs. Claridge Press.
Scruton, Roger (2000). "Animal Rights", City Journal, summer.
Singer, Peter (April 5, 1973). "Animal liberation", The New York Review of Books, Volume 20, Number 5.
Singer, Peter (1990) [1975]. Animal Liberation. New York Review Books.
Singer, Peter (2000) [1998]. Ethics into Action: Henry Spira and the Animal Rights Movement. Rowman & Littlefield Publishers, Inc.
Singer, Peter (2003). "Animal liberation at 30", The New York Review of Books, vol 50, no. 8, May 15.
Singer, Peter (2004). "Ethics Beyond Species and Beyond Instincts," in Sunstein and Nussbaum, op cit.
Singer, Peter (2011) [1979]. Practical Ethics. Cambridge University Press.
Sprigge, T.L.S. (1981) "Interests and Rights: The Case against Animals", Journal of Medical Ethics. June, 7(2): 95–102.
Stamp Dawkins, Marian (1980). Animal Suffering: The Science of Animal Welfare. Chapman and Hall.
Stucki, Saskia (2020) "Towards a Theory of Legal Animal Rights: Simple and Fundamental Rights", Oxford Journal of Legal Studies 40:533-560.
Sunstein, Cass R. (2004). "Introduction: What are Animal Rights?" in Sunstein and Nussbaum, op cit.
Sunstein, Cass R. and Nussbaum, Martha (2005). Animal Rights: Current Debates and New Directions. Oxford University Press. 
Taylor, Angus (2009). Animals and Ethics: An Overview of the Philosophical Debate. Broadview Press.
Taylor, Thomas (1792). "A Vindication of the Rights of Brutes," in Craciun, Adriana (2002). A Routledge Literary Sourcebook on Mary Wollstonecraft's A Vindication of the Rights of Woman. Routledge.
Vallentyne, Peter (2005). "Of Mice and Men: Equality and Animals", The Journal of Ethics, Vol. 9, No. 3/4, pp. 403–433.
Vallentyne, Peter (2007). "Of Mice and Men: Equality and Animals" in Nils Holtug, and Kasper Lippert-Rasmussen (eds.) (2007). Egalitarianism: New Essays on the Nature and Value of Equality. Oxford University Press.

Walker, Stephen (1983). Animal Thoughts. Routledge.
Weir, Jack (2009). "Virtue Ethics," in Marc Bekoff. Encyclopedia of Animal Rights and Animal Welfare. Greenwood. 
Williams, Erin E. and DeMello, Margo (2007). Why Animals Matter. Prometheus Books.
Wise, Steven M. (2000). Rattling the Cage: Toward Legal Rights for Animals. Da Capo Press.
Wise, Steven M. (2002). Drawing the Line: Science and the Case for Animal Rights. Perseus.
Wise, Steven M. (2004). "Animal Rights, One Step at a Time," in Sunstein and Nussbaum, op cit.
Wise, Steven M. (2007). "Animal Rights", Encyclopædia Britannica.

Further reading

Lubinski, Joseph (2002). "Overview Summary of Animal Rights", The Animal Legal and Historical Center at Michigan State University College of Law.
"Great Apes and the Law", The Animal Legal and Historical Center at Michigan State University College of Law.
Bekoff, Marc (ed.) (2009). The Encyclopedia of Animal Rights and Animal Welfare. Greenwood.
Best, Steven and Nocella II, Anthony J. (eds).  (2004). Terrorists or Freedom Fighters? Reflections on the Liberation of Animals. Lantern Books
Chapouthier, Georges and Nouët, Jean-Claude (eds.) (1998). The Universal Declaration of Animal Rights. Ligue Française des Droits de l'Animal.
Dawkins, Richard (1993). Gaps in the mind, in Cavalieri, Paola and Singer, Peter (eds.). The Great Ape Project. St. Martin's Griffin.
Dombrowski, Daniel (1997). Babies and Beasts: The Argument from Marginal Cases. University of Illinois Press.

Foltz, Richard (2006). Animals in Islamic Tradition and Muslim Cultures. Oneworld Publications.
Franklin, Julian H. (2005). Animal Rights and Moral Philosophy. University of Columbia Press.
Gruen, Lori (2003). "The Moral Status of Animals", Stanford Encyclopedia of Philosophy, July 1, 2003.
_ (2011). Ethics and Animals. Cambridge University Press.
Hall, Lee (2006). Capers in the Churchyard: Animal Rights Advocacy in the Age of Terror. Nectar Bat Press.
Linzey, Andrew and Clarke, Paul A. B.(eds.) (1990). Animal Rights: A Historic Anthology. Columbia University Press.
Mann, Keith (2007). From Dusk 'til Dawn: An Insider's View of the Growth of the Animal Liberation Movement. Puppy Pincher Press.
McArthur, Jo-Anne and Wilson, Keith (eds). (2020). Hidden: Animals in the Anthropocene. Lantern Publishing & Media.
Neumann, Jean-Marc (2012). "The Universal Declaration of Animal Rights or the Creation of a New Equilibrium between Species". Animal Law Review volume 19–1.
Nibert, David (2002). Animal Rights, Human Rights: Entanglements of Oppression and Liberation. Rowman and Litterfield.

Patterson, Charles (2002). Eternal Treblinka: Our Treatment of Animals and the Holocaust. Lantern.
Rachels, James (1990). Created from Animals: The Moral Implications of Darwinism. Oxford University Press.
Regan, Tom and Singer, Peter (eds.) (1976). Animal Rights and Human Obligations. Prentice-Hall.
Spiegel, Marjorie (1996). The Dreaded Comparison: Human and Animal Slavery. Mirror Books.
Sztybel, David (2006). "Can the Treatment of Animals Be Compared to the Holocaust?"  Ethics and the Environment 11 (Spring): 97–132.
Tobias, Michael (2000). Life Force: The World of Jainism. Asian Humanities Press.
Wilson, Scott (2010). "Animals and Ethics" Internet Encyclopedia of Philosophy.

 
Bioethics
Political movements
Ethical schools and movements
Animal ethics